Eggerthella is a bacterial genus of Actinomycetota, in the family Coriobacteriaceae. Members of this genus are anaerobic, non-sporulating, non-motile, Gram-positive bacilli that grow singly, as pairs, or in short chains. They are found in the human colon and feces and have been implicated as a cause of ulcerative colitis, liver and anal abscesses and systemic bacteremia.

The type strain for this genus, Eggerthella lenta, was known as Eubacterium lentum prior to 1999.  The genus is named for Arnold Eggerth, who first described the organism in 1935.

Eggerthella has not been characterized well because of identification difficulties. It is an emerging pathogen that is likely to be studied and recognized more in years to come. It has a tendency to cause disease that spreads throughout the body.

See also
 List of bacterial vaginosis microbiota

References

External links
  

Coriobacteriaceae
Bacterial vaginosis
Bacteria genera